Fatimata Tamboura (born 19 September 1987) is a Senegalese footballer who plays as a midfielder for US Parcelles Assainies and the Senegal women's national team.

International career
Tamboura capped for Senegal at senior level during the 2014 African Women's Championship qualification.

References

1987 births
Living people
Women's association football midfielders
Senegalese women's footballers
Senegal women's international footballers